Little Buds Vidya Niketan School is a school in  New Allapur Borabanda, Hyderabad, Andhra Pradesh 500018, India. Established in 1989. The school's principal/incharge is Syed Jameel. This school is recognised by the Govt. of Telangana.

References

Schools in Hyderabad, India
1989 establishments in Andhra Pradesh
Educational institutions established in 1989